Lone Wolf: The Roleplaying Game is a role-playing game published by Mongoose Publishing in 2005.

Description
Lone Wolf: The Roleplaying Game is based on the Lone Wolf series of gamebooks.

Publication history
Lone Wolf: The Roleplaying Game (2004-2005) was one of several Open Game License games inspired by the D20 System that Mongoose Publishing published between 2003 to 2006. Mongoose also produced their own miniatures for their games, including Lone Wolf.

Reception

References

British role-playing games
Fantasy role-playing games
Lone Wolf (gamebooks)
Mongoose Publishing games
Role-playing games based on novels
Role-playing games introduced in 2005